A by-election was held for the New South Wales Legislative Assembly electorate of Braidwood on 20 September 1869 because of the resignation of Joshua Josephson to accept an appointment as a judge of the District Court.

Dates

Results

Joshua Josephson resigned to accept an appointment as a judge of the District Court.

See also
Electoral results for the district of Braidwood
List of New South Wales state by-elections

References

1869 elections in Australia
New South Wales state by-elections
1860s in New South Wales